Robert Kennett Kingsford (23 December 1849 – 14 October 1895) was an English footballer who made one appearance for England in 1874, and was a member of the Wanderers team that won the 1873 FA Cup Final.

Career
Kingsford was born in Sydenham and was educated at Marlborough College, where he played football for the college. After leaving college, he played for the Old Marlburians and the Wanderers, winning the FA Cup with the Wanderers in 1873. In the final, played at Lillie Bridge on 29 March 1873, the Wanderers defeated  Oxford University 2–0.

He made his solitary England appearance on 7 March 1874 against Scotland, playing as an outside forward. After "a most competitive game", Scotland won 2–1, with Kingsford scoring England's opening goal in the 22nd minute, before the Scots scored twice.

On 31 October 1874, Kingsford scored five in a game against Farningham.

Kingsford also played for Crystal Palace and represented Surrey at football, and took over from Charles Alcock as secretary to the Wanderers in 1874.

He was also a useful cricketer, and played three first-class matches for Surrey as a wicket-keeper.

He studied law, and emigrated to live in Adelaide, Australia. On 14 October 1895 aged 45, Kennett died in Guernsey, where his wife came from.

Honours
Wanderers
FA Cup: winners 1873

International goals
Scores and results list England's goal tally first.

References

External links

England profile
Cricket career at cricketarchive.com
cricinfo profile

1849 births
1895 deaths
Association football forwards
Crystal Palace F.C. (1861) players
England international footballers
English cricketers
English footballers
FA Cup Final players
People educated at Marlborough College
People from Sydenham, London
Surrey cricketers
Wanderers F.C. players
Wicket-keepers